Royal Palm Beach Pines Natural Area is a 773-acre area of protected land in Royal Palm Beach, Florida that includes pine flatwoods and wet prairie. There are hiking and equestrian trails, a nature trail, and boardwalk. The park is located at 110 Nature's Way or the northern entrance on 40th Street and Avocado Boulevard.

References

Nature reserves in Florida
Protected areas of Palm Beach County, Florida